Kittens was a Canadian noise rock band from Winnipeg.  The band was known for their intense live performances and country-influenced sound.

History
Shawn Fedorchuk, Russ Desjardine and Steve Kellas started Kittens together after they disbanded their previous band, Batsweat, recruiting drummer David Kelly and releasing the album Like A Plough on cassette.  Desjardine (who went on to play bass in Artificial Joy and helped found The Bonaduces as drummer) and Steve then left the band and Jahmeel Russell joined on bass.

Kittens released several albums on Sonic Unyon in the late 1990s. Of all of their albums, the only ones to be released as a vinyl LP were 1997's "Bazooka and the Hustler" and their split release with Shallow North Dakota. All other albums were released either on cassette or compact disc. The group disbanded in 1999. 

Kittens played two reunion shows in 2006 with KEN mode's Jesse Matthewson replacing Russel on bass.
Russell is now a member of Projektor. David Kelly died in Los Angeles, CA in March 2008.

In 2014, Blunderspublik released a cover album, Kittens and Shit, commemorating Winnipeg's 1990s bands, including Kittens.

Members
Jahmeel Russell - vocals, bass (1995—1999)
Shawn Fedorchuk - vocals, guitar (1992—1999, 2006)
David Kelly - drums (1992—1999, 2006)
Russ Desjardine - bass (1992—1995)
Steve Kellas - guitar, bass (1992—1995)
Jesse Matthewson - bass (2006)

Discography

Studio albums
Doberman (1994)
Tiger Comet (1995)
Rhinoceros Love with Shallow North Dakota (1996)
Bazooka and The Hustler (1997)
The Night Danger Album (1998)

Singles & EPs
Like A Plough (1992)
 Pony (1993)
 Grizzly (1993)
"Calico" (1995)
Hawaii (1997)

Compilations
Low-Fi Classics & Other Rarities (1998)

References

External links
Kittens on Myspace
Kittens on last fm

Musical groups established in 1992
Musical groups disestablished in 1999
Musical groups from Winnipeg
Canadian alternative rock groups
1992 establishments in Manitoba
1999 disestablishments in Canada
Canadian musical trios
Sonic Unyon artists